Rick Gray (born in Omaha, Nebraska) is an American politician and former member of the Arizona Senate as well as a former Republican member of the Arizona House of Representatives representing District 21. Gray previously served consecutively from January 10, 2011 until January 14, 2013 in the District 9 seat.

In 2016, Gray ran for a seat on the Arizona Corporation Commission, but placed fourth in the Republican primary.

In 2018, Gray was appointed to fill the Arizona State Senate seat vacated by Debbie Lesko after she resigned to run for Congress.

Early life and education
Gray was born and raised in Omaha, Nebraska. He earned his Bachelor of Science degree with a dual major of Organizational Leadership and Biblical Studies from Grace University in Omaha, Nebraska.

Elections
 2014 Gray and Tony Rivero were unopposed in the Republican primary. Gray and Rivero defeated Esther Duran Lumm in the general election. Republican Bryan Hackbarth was removed from the ballot before the primary, while Helmuth Hack (L) withdrew from the race. Gray received 29,589 votes.(PDF)
 2012 Redistricted to District 21 with fellow incumbent Representative Debbie Lesko, and with incumbent Representatives Thomas Forese and J. D. Mesnard redistricted to District 17, Lesko and Gray were unopposed for the August 28, 2012 Republican Primary; Lesko placed first, and Gray placed second with 12,515 votes; Gray won the five-way November 6, 2012 General election, with Lesko taking the first seat and Gray taking the second seat with 39,791 votes against Democratic nominees Carol Lokare, Sheri Van Horsen (who had run for Legislature seats in 2006, 2008, and 2010) and a Libertarian write-in candidate.
 2010 When Republican Representative Rick Murphy ran for Arizona Senate and left a District 9 seat open, Gray ran alongside incumbent Republican Representative Debbie Lesko in the three-way August 24, 2010 Republican Primary, placing second with 9,055 votes; in the three-way November 2, 2010 General election, Lesko took the first seat, and Gray took the second seat with 28,459 votes against Democratic nominee Shirley McAllister, who had run for the seat in 2002.
 2016 Gray ran for a seat on the Arizona Corporation Commission, alongside Andy Tobin and Al Melvin, but placed fourth in the Republican primary election.
 2018 Gray was appointed by the republican state senate to Debbie Lesko's seat when she resigned to run for Congress.
 2020 Gray ran unopposed for reelection to his district 21 seat and won.  He is now also the Arizona State Senate Majority Leader.

Personal life
Gray is married to Lisa Gray and has four children. He resides in Sun City.

References

External links
 Official page at the Arizona State Legislature
 Campaign site
 

21st-century American politicians
Republican Party Arizona state senators
Grace University alumni
Living people
Republican Party members of the Arizona House of Representatives
People from Sun City, Arizona
Politicians from Omaha, Nebraska
Year of birth missing (living people)